Eddy William Putman is a former Major League Baseball catcher. He played mostly behind the plate, but also played some first base and third base.

Sources

Major League Baseball catchers
Chicago Cubs players
Detroit Tigers players
Key West Cubs players
Midland Cubs players
Wichita Aeros players
Evansville Triplets players
Rochester Red Wings players
USC Trojans baseball players
Baseball players from California
1953 births
Living people